Saint Paul College of Ilocos Sur, also referred to by its acronym SPCIS or SPC Ilocos Sur, is a private Catholic basic and higher education institution run by the Sisters of Saint Paul of Chartres in Bayubay, San Vicente, Ilocos Sur. It is the oldest private school in Ilocos Sur, Philippines and is a member school of the Saint Paul University System. It was founded by the Sisters of Saint Paul in 1905.

History

The school was originally established in Vigan, Ilocos Sur, in 1905 by the Sisters of St. Paul of Chartres. In 1911, it was incorporated as the "Girls College of Our Lady of the Rosary." Secondary Education was introduced on 1912;, a Junior Normal College was started in 1946, providing courses in the Liberal Arts, an Elementary course in Piano (1950), and a  four-year Bachelor of Science in Elementary Education.

In 1961 the name became "Rosary College of Vigan, Incorporated" and in 1969, "St. Paul College of Ilocos Sur." Male students were first accepted in the College Department in 1965. The school expanded to a new site in Bayubay, San Vicente, starting in 1997.

On June 29, 2010, St. Paul University System incorporated St. Paul College of Ilocos Sur as an affiliate member of the SPUS whose other members are St. Paul University Philippines at Tugegarao City, St. Paul University Dumaguete, St. Paul University Iloilo, St. Paul University Manila, St. Paul University Quezon City, and St. Paul University Surigao.

Academic programs

Graduate school
These consists of  onsite and online classes.

College
Department of Arts, Sciences and Teacher Education
Bachelor of Arts (AB) with majors in English, Mathematics, Filipino, and Religious Education
Bachelor of Elementary Education (BEEd)
Bachelor of Secondary Education (BSEd) with majors in Biological Sciences, English, Mathematics, Filipino, Home Economics, and Religious Education

Department of Nursing
Bachelor of Science in Nursing (BSN)

Department of Business Education 
Bachelor of Science in Accountancy (BSA)
Bachelor of Science in Business Administration (BSBA) major in Financial Management and Human Resources Management
Bachelor of Science in Entrepreneurship (BSEntrepreneur)
Bachelor of Science in Information Technology (BSIT)

Department of Hospitality and Tourism Management 
Bachelor of Science in Hospitality Management (BSHM)
Bachelor of Science in Tourism Management (BSTM)
Associate in Hotel and Restaurant Services (HRS)
Associate in Tourism

Senior High School
Academic Track
Accountancy, Business, and Management (ABM)
General Academics Strand (GAS)
Humanities and Social Sciences (HumSS)
Science, Technology, Engineering, and Mathematics (STEM)

Technical-Vocational Track 
Food and Beverages Services
Information Technology
Local Guiding Services

Junior high school
Special Science High School Curriculum
 Grade 7-10

Grade School
Kindergarten
Grades 1 to 6

ECA
MTG, ICAS, AMC, IMAS, M-Tap

School Accreditation
(PAASCU Accredited Level III)
 Grade School
 High School Department

(PAASCU Re-Accredited Level II)
College Department - Department of Arts, Sciences and Teacher Education

See also
St. Paul University Philippines, Tuguegarao City
St. Paul University Manila, Metro Manila
St. Paul University Quezon City, Metro Manila
St. Paul University at San Miguel, Bulacan
St. Paul University Dumaguete, Negros Oriental
St. Paul University Iloilo, Iloilo City
St. Paul University Surigao, Surigao del Norte

References

External links
 

Universities and colleges in Ilocos Sur
Catholic universities and colleges in the Philippines
Catholic elementary schools in the Philippines
Catholic secondary schools in the Philippines
Graduate schools in the Philippines
1905 establishments in the Philippines
Educational institutions established in 1905